Erkin Hadimoğlu (born 1972 in Istanbul, Turkey), is a present member of the famous prominent Turkish band Yeni Türkü. He plays the piano, and other keyboard instruments.

Life
In 1981 he attended a music conservatory in Istanbul, and in 1991 he went to the Marmara University music section. In 1992 he joined the Yeni Türkü band. He took violin lessons from Ernst Patkolo and Mete Yesügey, and took conducting lessons from Mine Mucur and Duygu Önal.

See also
List of pop and rock pianists

External links
More on his life
Yeni Turku website 

1972 births
Living people
Turkish pianists
21st-century pianists